'The Relative of His Excellency' (Hungarian:A kegyelmes úr rokona) is a 1941 Hungarian comedy film directed by Félix Podmaniczky and starring László Szilassy, Erzsi Simor and Artúr Somlay. It was based on a novel by Zoltán Szitnyai. The production manager was Ernő Gottesmann.

Plot summary

Cast
 László Szilassy - Szávay Gábor
 Erzsi Simor - Klára
 Artúr Somlay - Szávay Ákos, vezérigazgató
 Mária Mezey - Aliz 
 Kálmán Rózsahegyi - Kublics
 Gyula Csortos - Rafael
 Zoltán Greguss - Tihamér, Aliz bátyja
 Gyula Kőváry - Józsi bácsi 
 Sándor Pethes - Ödön

References

External links
 

1941 films
Hungarian comedy films
1940s Hungarian-language films
Films based on Hungarian novels
1941 comedy films
Hungarian black-and-white films